Dörarp is a small locality (according to the definition of Statistics Sweden) in Ljungby Municipality, Sweden. In 2005, Dörarp had 145 inhabitants.

Dörarp is also the site of thrash metal band Metallica's tour bus accident during the Damage, Inc. Tour on September 27, 1986. Vocalist James Hetfield, guitarist Kirk Hammett and drummer Lars Ulrich survived with minor injuries, but bassist Cliff Burton was pinned under the bus and pronounced dead. Former Flotsam and Jetsam bassist Jason Newsted was recruited as Metallica's new bassist in 1986 until his departure in 2001. The site of the crash has been marked with Burton's commemorative memorial stone.

References

Populated places in Kronoberg County
Finnveden